This is a list of the 10 most popular songs in Mexico for each year between 1950 and 1960, as published in the book "El Sound Track de la vida cotidiana", by Fernando Mejía Barquera.

Overview

In addition to the continued prominence of bolero music (typically performed by tríos) which had been popular since the previous decade, Mexican music in the 50s was dominated by domestic ranchera music and Cuban mambo. 

Ranchera music, generally associated with rural Mexico but popular in urban areas as well, got a considerable boost from the massive popularity of Pedro Infante (an actor and ranchera singer who was present on the Mexican music charts from the beginning of the decade until his death in 1957) and the emergence of songwriter José Alfredo Jiménez (who, after writing many hit songs for other ranchera singers, eventually began to record his own songs).

The successful 1950 recording "Qué rico mambo", by Dámaso Pérez Prado and his orchestra, is considered as having initiated the boom of mambo music in Mexico. This genre became so popular with Mexican audiences that many Cuban performers (such as the aforementioned Pérez Prado and Beny Moré) moved to Mexico and appeared in Mexican movies, and it also paved the way for other Cuban musicians (such as the Sonora Matancera) who played genres other than mambo to find success in Mexico. The mambo craze of the 50s in Mexico, specially in urban areas where it became linked to the pachuco subculture, has been compared to the rock and roll craze that would sweep the United States in the same decade.

The year 1960 marked the beginning of a new era, with the appearance of the first nationwide rock and roll hits: "La hiedra venenosa" (a cover of The Coasters' "Poison Ivy") by Los Rebeldes del Rock, and "La plaga" (a cover of Little Richard's "Good Golly, Miss Molly") by Los Teen Tops, paving the way for rock and roll music (usually through Spanish-language covers of American and British songs) to become the dominant genre in the Mexican charts of the 60s.

Year-end charts
The following year-end charts were elaborated by Mejía Barquera, based on weekly charts that were published on the magazine Selecciones musicales as compiled on Roberto Ayala's 1962 book "Musicosas: manual del comentarista de radio y televisión"; those charts were, according to Ayala, based on record sales, jukebox plays, radio and television airplay, and sheet music sales. Mejía Barquera then took one chart from the second week of every month of a calendar year, so as to have twelve charts per year, and asigned "points" to the songs on those charts based on their ranking (from 10 points for a first place to 1 point for a tenth place), adding up the points to make his year-end charts.

1950

1951

1952

1953

1954

1955

1956

1957

1958

1959

1960

Notes

References

Mexico
Mexican record charts
1950s in music
1950s in Mexico